Lake Thunderbird State Park is a  Oklahoma state park located in Cleveland County, Oklahoma.

National Public Radio reported that this park had over 637,000 visitors in 2011. It earned $461,506 from activity fees and cost $1.2 million to operate.

The park provides recreational access to Lake Thunderbird. There are two marinas (Calypso Cove Marina and Little River Marina), nine boat ramps and a swim area at the lake. The park has over 200 sites for parking Recreational Vehicles (RVs), including 30 full hookups. There are also restrooms, primitive campsites and a seasonal restaurant.

References

External links
Lake Thunderbird State Park
U.S. Geological Survey Map at the U.S. Geological Survey Map Website. Retrieved January 9th, 2023.

State parks of Oklahoma
Protected areas of Cleveland County, Oklahoma
Nature centers in Oklahoma